In topology, a cut-point is a point of a connected space such that its removal causes the resulting space to be disconnected. If removal of a point doesn't result in disconnected spaces, this point is called a non-cut point.

For example, every point of a line is a cut-point, while no point of a circle is a cut-point.

Cut-points are useful to determine whether two connected spaces are homeomorphic by counting the number of cut-points in each space. If two spaces have different number of cut-points, they are not homeomorphic. A classic example is using cut-points to show that lines and circles are not homeomorphic.

Cut-points are also useful in the characterization of topological continua, a class of spaces which combine the properties of compactness and connectedness and include many familiar spaces such as the unit interval, the circle, and the torus.

Definition

Formal definitions 
A cut-point of a connected T1 topological space X, is a point p in X such that X - {p} is not connected. A point which is not a cut-point is called a non-cut point.

A non-empty connected topological space X is a cut-point space if every point in X is a cut point of X.

Basic examples
A closed interval [a,b] has infinitely many cut-points. All points except for its end points are cut-points and the end-points {a,b} are non-cut points.
An open interval (a,b) also has infinitely many cut-points like closed intervals. Since open intervals don't have end-points, it has no non-cut points.
A circle has no cut-points and it follows that every point of a circle is a non-cut point.

Notations
A cutting of X is a set {p,U,V} where p is a cut-point of X, U and V form a separation of X-{p}.
Also can be written as X\{p}=U|V.

Theorems

Cut-points and homeomorphisms 
 Cut-points are not necessarily preserved under continuous functions. For example: f: [0, 2] → R2, given by f(x) = (cos x, sin x). Every point of the interval (except the two endpoints) is a cut-point, but f(x) forms a circle which has no cut-points.
 Cut-points are preserved under homeomorphisms. Therefore, cut-point is a topological invariant.

Cut-points and continua 
 Every continuum (compact connected Hausdorff space)  with more than one point, has at least two non-cut points. Specifically, each open set which forms a separation of resulting space contains at least one non-cut point.
 Every continuum with exactly two noncut-points is homeomorphic to the unit interval.
 If K is a continuum with points a,b and K-{a,b} isn't  connected, K is homeomorphic to the unit circle.

Topological properties of cut-point spaces 
 Let X be a connected space and x be a cut point in X such that X\{x}=A|B. Then {x} is either open or closed. if {x} is open, A and B are closed. If {x} is closed, A and B are open.
 Let X be a cut-point space. The set of closed points of X is infinite.

Irreducible cut-point spaces

Definitions 
A cut-point space is irreducible if no proper subset of it is a cut-point space.

The Khalimsky line is the set  endowed with this topology. It's a cut-point space. Moreover, it's irreducible.

Theorem 
 A topological space  is an irreducible cut-point space if and only if X is homeomorphic to the Khalimsky line.

See also 
Cut point (graph theory)

References 
 

  (Originally published by Addison-Wesley Publishing Company, Inc. in 1970.)
General topology